Steinberg is a German and Ashkenazi Jewish surname. Variants: Shteinberg, Steinbarg.
Notable people with the surname include:

Music 
Billy Steinberg, American songwriter
Elliot Easton (born Elliot Steinberg, 1953), American musician
Lewie Steinberg, American bassist in the band Booker T. & the M.G.'s
Maximilian Steinberg (1883–1946), Lithuanian-Russian composer
Michael Steinberg (music critic) (1928–2009), American music critic and musicologist 
Michael P. Steinberg, American historian
Pinchas Steinberg (born 1945), Israeli conductor
Sebastian Steinberg (born 1959), American bassist in the band Soul Coughing
Simon Steinberg (1887-1955), Ukrainian composer
William Steinberg (1899–1978), German-American conductor
Lev Steinberg (1870-1945), Russian conductor and composer
Karl Steinberg (1952-), German founder of the musical software company Steinberg

Culture 
David Steinberg (born 1942), Canadian comedian, actor, director, and writer 
David I. Steinberg, American historian of Asia
Flo Steinberg, American independent comic book publisher
Hans H. Steinberg (born 1950), German actor
Jacob Steinberg (1887–1947), Israeli poet
Jonathan Steinberg (1934–2021), American historian of Germany 
Joshua Steinberg (1839–1908), Lithuanian-Russian writer and educator 
Leo Steinberg (1920–2011), American art historian
Michael Steinberg (filmmaker), American film director and producer
Morleigh Steinberg (born 1964), American dancer and choreographer
Neil Steinberg, American columnist
Saul Steinberg (1914–1999), Romanian-American cartoonist, notably for the New Yorker 
Susan Steinberg (author) American author and artist (painter)
Susan Steinberg (producer) American television writer/ producer / director

Science 
Deborah Lynn Steinberg, British sociologist
Gerald M. Steinberg, Israeli political scientist
Hannah Steinberg (1926–2019), British psychopharmacologist
Robert Steinberg, American mathematician
Rudolf Steinberg (born 1943), German professor, president of the Johann Wolfgang Goethe-University
Malcolm S. Steinberg (1930–2012), American biologist

Other people 
Alexander “Sasha” Hedges Steinberg, American drag queen, artist, actor and producer known as Sasha Velour
Annie Sprinkle (Born Ellen F. Steinberg, 1954), American pornographic actress sex educator and former prostitute
Darrell Steinberg (born 1959), Mayor of the city of Sacramento, California
Erna Steinberg (1911–2001), German Olympic sprinter
Gerry Steinberg (1945–2015), British politician
Isaac Nachman Steinberg, (1888–1957) left-revolutionary-politician, lawyer and writer
James B. Steinberg, American politician (Deputy Secretary of State)
Jerry Steinberg, American founder of social organisations
Joel Steinberg (born 1941), American attorney convicted of manslaughter
Joseph Steinberg (1883–1932), New York politician
Judith Steinberg Dean (born 1953), American physician and former First Lady of Vermont
Leigh Steinberg (born 1949), American sports agent
Leonard Steinberg, Baron Steinberg (1936–2009), British businessman
Mark Steinberg American sports agent (for Tiger Woods)
Melvin Steinberg (born 1933), American politician
Sam Steinberg (1905–1978), Canadian supermarket magnate
Saul Steinberg (business) (1939–2012), American investor

Fictional characters
 Charlie "Chuck" and Ruth “Ruthie” Steinberg, siblings in the 2019 film Scary Stories to Tell in the Dark

See also 
 Steinberg (disambiguation)
 Steinberger (disambiguation)

References 

German-language surnames
Jewish surnames